

Season summary
On 9 November 2010, Declan Ryan was appointed as the new Tipperary Senior hurling manager on a two-year term, succeeding Liam Sheedy.
He was joined by Tommy Dunne as the new team coach, with Michael Gleeson of Tipperary county champions Thurles Sarsfields completing the new Tipperary hurling management team.
Tipperarys first game of 2011 was in January in the 2011 Waterford Crystal Cup against WIT where they were defeated by a scoreline of 2–17 to 1–19 in Clonmel. Their first league game took place on 12 February against Kilkenny, which finished in a 1–10 to 1–17 defeat at Semple Stadium.
The first league win came in the third round on 5 March against Waterford by 1–20 to 0-18 under the floodlights at Semple Stadium. Tipperary finished in fourth place in division 1 and missed out on qualifying for the league final, which was won by Dublin.
On 29 May, Tipperary started their championship season by defeating Cork by 3–22 to 0–23 at Semple Stadium.
On 10 July, in the Munster Final, Tipperary defeated Waterford by 7–19 to 0–19 at Páirc Uí Chaoimh. Tipperary got past Dublin in the semi-final to meet Kilkenny in the 2011 All-Ireland Senior Hurling Championship Final where they were defeated by 2–17 to 1-16.
Tipperary GAA were sponsored by Skoda in 2011.
In October 2011 Benny Dunne announced his retirement from the inter-county hurling squad.

Tipperary Senior hurling squad 2011
Statistics correct to the end of 2011 Season

2011 National Hurling League

Division 1

Table

 Tipperary were placed ahead of Galway as they won the head–to–head match between the teams (3 April at Pearse Stadium: 4–23 – 1–14)

2011 All-Ireland Senior Hurling Championship

The 2011 GAA Hurling All-Ireland Senior Championship was the 123rd staging of the All-Ireland championship since its establishment in 1887.  The draw for the 2011 fixtures took place on 7 October 2010. The championship began on 14 May and ended on 4 September 2011. Tipperary were the defending champions.

Kilkenny retained the title after a 2–17 to 1–16 defeat of Tipperary in the final.

Munster Senior Hurling Championship

All-Ireland Senior Hurling Championship

References

External links
Tipperary GAA Archives 2011
2010 Teams and Results at Premierview
2011 All Ireland Final at Hurlingstats

Tipp
Tipperary county hurling team seasons